Ängelholm is a locality and the seat of Ängelholm Municipality in Skåne, Sweden with 39,612 inhabitants in 2010.

History
The old settlement Rynestad was mentioned around the year 1600.

The city was founded in 1516 as Engelholm by King Christian II of Denmark, who moved the settlement from Luntertun on the coast because it was difficult to defend. As a founder, King Christian II personally identified the boundaries of the new city, granting the city a charter in 1516. At Luntertun there is only a church garden left today.

The town remained small for centuries. Following the Treaty of Roskilde in 1658, Ängelholm, together with the rest of Skåne, was assigned by Denmark to Sweden. The town began to grow in the 19th century due to industrialization. It was also a garrison town until 1883 and had a Swedish Air Force base between 1941 and 2009. The older spelling Engelholm was retained until 1912, when the city council decided to adopt a more modern spelling in line with the Swedish spelling reform of 1906. The high-performance car manufacturer Koenigsegg Automotive is based on the premises of the decommissioned Scania Wing (F 10).

Contemporary
Tourism is an important industry for the city. There is a 6-kilometer long sandy beach right outside the town. The winds in Skälder Bay make the beach a popular place for sailors, wave surfers and wind surfers.

There is also an ice cream manufacturer, Engelholms Glass which produces about 1.2 million litres of ice-cream every year.

A special sight of Ängelholm is the UFO-Memorial Ängelholm.

It is known for its clay cuckoos — a special kind of ocarina. This is however a dying tradition as there is now only one producer of clay cuckoos, Sofia Nilsson. Ängelholm has the only orchestra of clay cuckoos in the whole world with which performed at the "Allsång på Skansen" in 2007.

Ängelholm is also the home of hockey team Rögle BK that competes in the SHL.

Notable people

 Emma Andersson, singer, model, chef, and TV personality
 Sebastian Andersson, Footballer
 Sofie Andersson, golfer
 Malik Bendjelloul, Academy Award winning filmmaker
 Frans G. Bengtsson, author
 Gösta Carlsson, road racing cyclist
 Jörgen Elofsson, songwriter
 Anna Fiske, illustrator and writer 
 Roger Hansson, ice hockey player
 Jill Johnson, singer
 Jörgen Jönsson, ice hockey player
 Kenny Jönsson, ice hockey player
 Christian von Koenigsegg, automotive mogul
 Jarl Kulle, actor and director
 Timothy Liljegren, ice hockey player
 Christopher Liljewall, ice hockey player
 Robert Mirosavic, footballer
 Rikard Nilsson, chef
 Gustav Olhaver, ice hockey player
 Maria Rooth, ice hockey player
 Sven Rydenfelt, economist
 Anton Santesson (born 1994), ice hockey defenceman
 Jenny Silver, singer
 Peter Svensson, tennis player
 Peter Wichers, musician

See also 
Heliga korsets kapell, Ängelholm

References

External links 

 Ängelholm' municipality
 Ängelholm's tourist web page

 
Municipal seats of Skåne County
Swedish municipal seats
Populated places in Ängelholm Municipality
Populated places in Skåne County
Coastal cities and towns in Sweden
Populated places established in 1516
16th-century establishments in Skåne County
Cities in Skåne County